General elections to the Canadian province of Prince Edward Island's unicameral legislative body, the Prince Edward Island House of Assembly. Prince Edward Island became part of the Canadian Confederation in 1873. Prior to that, Prince Edward Island was a British colony; the House of Assembly dates to 1769.

The number of seats has varied over time, from a high of thirty-two between the 1960s and 1990s, to the current low of twenty-seven.

Prince Edward Island was effectively a two-party system - the Liberal party (red) and Conservative party (blue) until the 2019 election. After the first two elections (when not all MLAs declared a party allegiance), until 2015, only one MLA had been elected who has not been a member of these two parties. The Green Party won their first seat in 2015, their second in a 2017 byelection, and won a total of 8 seats in 2019, to form the first Green Official Opposition. 

The Liberal party won eighteen out of twenty-nine of the elections in the 20th century.

Prior to 1996, PEI used 16 dual-member ridings; the 32 members have sat together since the 1893 abolition of the Legislative Council. The boundaries for these ridings were drawn in 1893; a single change was made in 1966 (when the riding of Charlottetown, also known as 5th Queens, was split into two parts). In 1996, a court determined that the number of electors varied too much between ridings, and was therefore unconstitutional. This resulted in a new set of (single-member) ridings being created.

Summary
The table below shows the total number of seats won by the major political parties at each election (if greater than zero). It also shows the percentage of the vote obtained by the major political parties at each election, if greater than 0.1%. The winning party's totals are shown in bold. To date, no party has formed a government that did not have the largest share of the vote. Full details on any election are linked via the year of the election at the start of the row.

Notes
  Includes results for Progressive Conservatives from 1942 onwards.
  Includes results for the Co-operative Commonwealth Federation from 1943 to 1951.
  Vote share not known for the elections in the 19th century.
  Tie between Conservatives and Liberals, resulting in the incumbent Conservatives remaining in power until losing a motion of confidence in 1891 after a series of by-election losses and the Liberals taking power for the remainder of the term.
  Includes 3.4% for the Progressive Party / United Farmers.

Historical voter turnouts

References

Bibliography
  (Number of MLAs per party for all elections)
  (Full results back to 1966)

See also
 Timeline of Canadian elections
 List of political parties in Prince Edward Island

Prince Edward Island general elections
Elections, general elections